Presidential elections were held for the first time in the Turkmen SSR on 27 October 1990. The only candidate was Saparmurat Niyazov, who won 98% of the vote. Voter turnout was 97%.

Results

References

Presidential elections in Turkmenistan
1990 in Turkmenistan
Single-candidate elections
Turkmenistan